Rino Barillari OMRI (born Limbadi, 8 February 1945) is an Italian photographer. He is often referred to as "The King of Paparazzi".
Barillari was appointed to the Order of Merit of the Italian Republic. He was named an honorary lecturer in photography at Xi'an International University in October 2011.

References

External links

1945 births
Living people
Italian photographers